Karl Schlegel (1893-1918) was a German First World War fighter ace credited with confirmed aerial victories over eight enemy airplanes and 14 observation balloons while flying combat for Jagdstaffel 45. Two combat claims for his final fatal dogfight on 27 October 1918 went unconfirmed.

The victory list

Karl Schlegel's victories are reported in chronological order, which is not necessarily the order or dates the victories were confirmed by headquarters.

Abbreviations were expanded by the editor creating this list.

Footnote

Citations

Sources
 
 

Aerial victories of Schlegel, Karl
Lists of World War I aerial victories